Media Home Entertainment Inc. was a home video company headquartered in Culver City, California, originally established in 1978 by filmmaker Charles Band.

Media Home Entertainment also distributed video product under three additional labels — The Nostalgia Merchant (very old or classic films), Hi-Tops Video (children's videos), and Fox Hills Video (special-interest videos/obscure B-movies and low-profile Cannon pictures). The "Fox Hills" name was derived from a geographical location near the company's headquarters at 5700 Buckingham Parkway.

History 
The company got off to a rocky start when ABKCO Records successfully sued them for releasing The Rolling Stones' Hyde Park concert on Betamax and VHS, followed by a successful suit against it, VCI Home Video, and Video Tape Network filed by Northern Songs for releasing Beatles material (Media's tapes included Around The Beatles—featuring the Beatles and the Rolling Stones as backup singers, with performers such as Long John Baldry—a John Lennon solo concert, Magical Mystery Tour, a Shea Stadium concert, Sextette—featuring Beatles member Ringo Starr—and a Tokyo concert), but would eventually become one of the largest independent video distributors in the U.S., relying on acquired films, television programs, and children's programs to establish a library of product. Some releases from the company included the original Halloween, the majority of the Peanuts specials (up to 1984), The Adventures of the Wilderness Family, Enemies, A Love Story, I Come in Peace, some films from the Cannon Films library, and all of the Nightmare on Elm Street films in the 1980s (1984–1989), the first two Texas Chain Saw Massacre'''s (1974's original and 1986's second, "2", both Tobe Hooper's direction) and 1976's original John Carpenter's Assault on Precinct 13.

In 1983, Media Home Entertainment entered into an agreement with film distributor United Film Distribution Company whereas Media would release seven United Film Distribution Company's film titles on videocassette. Also, the following year, in 1984, the company bought out the home video rights of the movie Santa Claus: The Movie for $2.6 million from the Salkinds.

On April 18, 1984, the company received an agreement with Cinetel Productions and gave them right of first refusal on any direct-to-video project Cinetel has ever produced for Media Home Entertainment and the budget is in the $50-200,000 range for Cinetel/MHE projects. On April 25, 1984, Media Home Entertainment entered into an agreement in order to grab the home video rights to the Peanuts specials under the new "Snoopy's Home Video Library" banner and gave them the worldwide home video rights of all the specials, and has plans to produce direct-to-video material.

On July 14, 1984, the company had bought out The Nostalgia Merchant, which was previously a distributor of classic, contemporary and modern films on videocassette, for an undisclosed seven-price tag.

In 1984, Media Home Entertainment was bought by Heron Communications Inc., a subsidiary of Gerald Ronson's Heron International. However, by late 1990, Media Home Entertainment had begun downsizing its staff and selling off its video assets in the wake of Ronson's involvement in the Guinness share-trading fraud in Great Britain.

On September 14, 1985, Media Home Entertainment and The Cannon Group inked an agreement that they would pick up videocassette rights to upcoming 32 films from the studio's own feature film catalog, which is the largest deals in the video industry. In 1986, Trans World Entertainment had inked an agreement with Media Home Entertainment whereas the eight theatrical Trans World titles would be handled on video by Media Home Entertainment. In February 1986, Media Home Entertainment entered into the U.S. Hispanic market by launching its own Spanish product line Condor Video, which was growing to became the biggest video distributor in the sector, and had an agreement with American General Film Distribution, the largest U.S. Hispanic film distributor ever, and also had Spanish-subtitled versions of Media's flagship products, which were The Cannon Group, as well as entities in the Nightmare on Elm Street film franchise, which had a total of 124 titles in the library.

In April 1987, Media Home Entertainment reportedly considered to be put up for sale by its owners, as Carolco Pictures, who owned a majority interest in rival home video distributor International Video Entertainment were all bidding $100 million, along with other investments who bid lots of millions, but no talks were interested. Over time, in the late 1980s, the company had set up labels such as Hi-Tops Video, Fox Hills Video and The Cinematheque Collection. Heron decided to raise $100 million into the Heron Communications branch in 1987, an there are no talkers because the price is too high, but the plan was to abort the purchase of various buyers and spent $75 million budgeted for Heron Communications that paid programming acquisitions during fiscal 1987. In July 1987, Media Home Entertainment and parent Heron Communications had inked a pact with Troma Entertainment to distribute nine films on videocassette, namely Surf Nazis Must Die, Student Confidential, Lust for Freedom, Story of a Junkie, Ferocious Female Freedom Fighters, Deadly Daphne's Revenge, Troma's War, Fortress in America and an untitled picture. In late August 1987, Media Home Entertainment and Trans World Entertainment made a third agreement that would cover six pictures shown in the agreement, namely Full Moon in Blue Water, Kansas, Killer Klowns from Outer Space, Hardcover, Cinderella Rock and Teen Witch, which paid $15 million, and the company already had video rights to the prior 14 TWE titles that Heron held, such as Rage of Honor, Programmed to Kill and Iron Warrior'', and the six films involved in the Heron deal was expected to go by early 1988, before all rights reverted from Heron to TWE by 1989.

They briefly picked up the home video rights of the Morgan Creek Productions library.

Media Home Entertainment ceased final operations in 1993. At that time, its final titles being prepared for video release were acquired by and subsequently distributed by Fox Video (also some by CBS/Fox Video), while their laserdisc releases continued to be distributed by Image Entertainment. In the meantime, Media sold their library to budget label Video Treasures. Videos from the Media Home Entertainment library were also distributed overseas in the United Kingdom, Australia and New Zealand by VPD (Video Program Distributors) and Video Classics and in Japan by Tohokushinsha Film, respectively. Some releases by Media Home Entertainment and its associated sublabels were distributed in Canada by Astral Video, a now-defunct subsidiary of the present-day Astral Media (now part Of Bell Media). Media Home Entertainment also had exclusive rights to the NFL Films video library from the late 1980s to about 1992 before PolyGram Video would finally get the rights later in that same year. After it shut down, MHE moved the Kathy Smith titles to A*Vision Entertainment under the then-new BodyVision label.

References 

Home video companies of the United States
Defunct mass media companies of the United States
Entertainment companies based in California
Mass media companies established in 1979
Mass media companies disestablished in 1993
1979 establishments in California
1993 disestablishments in California
Defunct companies based in Greater Los Angeles